Borbo sirena is a butterfly in the family Hesperiidae. It is found in the Democratic Republic of the Congo, Uganda, western Kenya, south-western Tanzania and northern Zambia.

References

Butterflies described in 1937
Hesperiinae